Olier was a former provincial electoral district in the Montreal region of  Quebec, Canada that elected members to the National Assembly of Quebec.

It was created for the 1966 election, from part of Bourget electoral district.  Its final election was in 1970.  It disappeared in the 1973 election and its successor electoral districts were Viau, Jeanne-Mance and Bourassa.

It was presumably named after Jean-Jacques Olier, founder of the Sulpician Order.

Members of the Legislative Assembly / National Assembly
Fernand Picard, Liberal (1966–1973)

External links
Election results
 Election results (National Assembly)
 Election results (Quebecpolitique.com)

Former provincial electoral districts of Quebec